Ernest Harrison (22 July 1874 – 14 November 1968) was an Australian cricketer. He played ten first-class matches for Tasmania between 1902 and 1911.

Harrison served overseas with the 15 Infantry Battalion of the Australian Army in World War I.

See also
 List of Tasmanian representative cricketers

References

External links
 

1874 births
1968 deaths
Australian cricketers
Tasmania cricketers
Cricketers from Tasmania
Australian military personnel of World War I